Delčevo Municipality — municipality in Eastern Macedonia. The center of the municipality is the city of Delchevo. The geographical area is 423 km2 (163 mi2) and has about 13,585 inhabitants. There are 22 settlements in Delchevo, as follows: the town of Delchevo and the villages: Bigla, Vetren, Virce, Vratislavci, Gabrovo, Grad, Dramche, Zvegor, Iliovo, Kiselica, Kosovo Dabje, Nov Istevnik, Ochipala, Razlovci, Selnik, Stamer, Star Istevnik, Trabotivishte, Turija, Poleto and Chiflik. The city is named after the pride of the Macedonian people – Goce Delchev. In the past, the municipality was also known as "Carevo Selo".

Location 
164 km (102 mi) east of Skopje, at the foot of Mount Golak, spread on both banks of the river Bregalnica lies the town of Delchevo. It is the largest settlement in the Pijanec area, which stretches over an area of 585 km2 (226 mi2), located between the Osogovo Mountains (north) and Maleshevo (south). The city lies at an altitude of 590 m (1.940 ft) to 640 m (2.100 ft). Despite being located in the easternmost part of the country, Delchevo has a relatively good geographical position and traffic connection. It is a crossroads for eastern Macedonia. Through Pehchevo (27 km/17 mi) and Berovo (34 km/21 mi) it is connected with Strumica to the south, and through Makedonska Kamenica (24 km/15 mi) and Kocani (51 km/32 mi) it is connected with Shtip to the northwest. To the west is Vinica (39 km/24 mi), and to the east is the border crossing with Bulgaria, called "Arnautski Grob" (Arnaut's grave) (11 km/7 mi), through which you can reach the capital of Pirin Macedonia – Gorna Dzumaja (Blagoevgrad) (34 km/21 mi)

All rural settlements and the recreation center Golak are connected to the city by asphalt roads of regional and local type, while a modern national road is built to the border crossing. The farthest settlement from the municipal center is the historic village Razlovci (17.5 km/11 mi).

History 
Delchevo, according to a legend in Byzantine times was called Vasilevo, which translated from Greek means Tsarevo Selo. For the first time as a settlement Carevo Selo is mentioned in a charter of Tsar Dushan from 1347 to 1350. with it he gave several places and fields from Pijanec to the Lesnovo Monastery. In Turkish times Delchevo was also called Sultanija.

Ottoman period 
Until the 17th century, the settlement laid on the right side of the river Bregalnica on the present toponym Selishte, more precisely under the hill Ostrec near the road leading to Bulgaria. From the first centuries of Turkish rule there is not much information about the position of Delchevo. In the middle of the 17th century, Sultan Mehmed IV lived in its vicinity. At the time of his visit to Pijanec, mass Islamization was carried out on the population. Due to the oppression and pressure, many Macedonian settlements were deserted, including the then Tsarevo Selo. It is assumed that at the time of that sultan the settlement was moved to its present place on the left side of the river Bregalnica. The city mosque built in the 17th century is also cited as evidence.

However, it is thought-provoking that the Turkish travel writer Evliya Çelebi spent here only a few years later in 1670 and wrote in his Travelogue:

"From Vinica we climbed the Kocani mountain ore, moving through the gorge and after four hours we reached Tsarevo Selo. This is a Muslim village at the foot of a mountain and is decorated with about 100 houses and a magnificent mosque mined by a minaret."

We should also mention the folk tradition that says that the settlement under the Ostrec hill was deserted when the plague reigned and the surviving population settled on the place where Delchevo is today.

The oldest part of the city is considered to be the Turkish colony that was created around the mosque. According to Jaranov, until the 19th century Delchevo was a village, a Turkish colony, inhabited by purebred Turks and a large part of the Islamized Slavic population, called Pomaks, who did not know the Turkish language. Only a few families were Bulgarian Exarchists.

Towards the middle of the 19th century, the bazaar began to develop and the settlement to grow, and at the same time the Christian population to increase. After the space in Sredno Maalo (Middle Neighbourhood) was filled, the spread through Gocho Potok i.e. Gorno Maalo (Upper Neighbourhood) started or today's I region. In 1863 there were 75 Orthodox houses in Delchevo, and in 1873 109 Orthodox houses.

In 1856, the construction of the church was completed, whose surrounding was mainly inhabited by locals fleeing Turkish oppression in the surrounding villages. There was a larger emigration of the population from this area in 1878 after the Russo-Turkish war. After the end of the war, the famous Bulgarian voivode Ilija Markov (Grandfather Iljo Maleshevski) created the little-known Pijanec Republic, and after its destruction, the Bulgarian Exarchist population, fearing for their safety, fled the region seeking refuge on the territory of newly created Bulgaria. About 150 households from the villages and the city moved to the Kyustendil region. A small number of those refugees later returned. Turkish refugees from Bulgaria and even Bosnia and Herzegovina settled in the place of the emigrated Macedonian refugees. The Turkish refugees, called "Madzirci" settled in Madzir maalo (Madzir Neighbourhood), today's III district of the city.

On the left side by the river Bregalnica, on the narrow flat space where the bazzar and Inns were, the construction of the trade and craft shops along the two narrow streets started. With that, the bazaar was finally formed and Delchevo grew into a city settlement. According to the statistics of Bulgarian ethnographer Vasil Kanchov from 1900, 1610 inhabitants lived in Tsarevo Selo, 575 Bulgarian Muslims, 520 Bulgarian Exarchists, 425 Muslim Turks and 90 Romani.

Balkan and World wars 
During the Balkan Wars, a large number of Turks left the city, so that in 1914 the population was 1.701. After these wars, a new Macedonian population came from the surrounding villages, mostly from the passive villages of Bigla, Selnik and Dramche, which bought Turkish properties.

In 1931. the population increased to 3.746 inhabitants. After this year, the emigration of the Turkish population to Turkey continued voluntarily, especially in 1953. In 1935, the construction of the first houses on the right side of the river Bregalnica began.

After the liberation, on 23 April 1950, the Presidium of the National Assembly of the People's Republic of Macedonia decided that Tsarevo Selo should be renamed Delchevo, in honor of Goce Delchev.

In the sixties the town expanded on the right side of the river Bregalnica, and in the seventies on the hill Milkovo Brdo (Milkov's hill). With the increase of the employees in the working organizations in Delchevo, the number of the population in it also grew. Today Delchevo is a modern city settlement with wide asphalt streets and boulevards, sewerage network and parks and greenery.

Climate 
The climate in Delchevo is continental Eastern European. The average annual temperature in Delchevo is 11 °C (52 °F), with an absolute minimum of −26 °C (−15 °F) and an absolute maximum of 39 °C (102 °F), while in higher areas the average annual temperature drops to 3.5 °C (38 °F). The warmest month is August, and the coldest is January. Spring is always colder than autumn.

The cloudiness isn't strong, so the year is dominated by sunny and clear days. The average annual rainfall in Delchevo is 548 mm (22 in), and in the mountains over 1.600 meters (5,250 ft) above sea level. and up to 1.000 mm (39 in). Precipitation, although relatively low, their distribution in the vegetation period (April–September) is favorable and is over 50% of the total annual precipitation.

The vegetation period with a temperature higher than 10 °C (50 °F) lasts 191 days during the year. This favorable climate allows the growth of various plants, and is also a very suitable natural condition for the development of tourism in this area.

Demographics 
From the analysis of the demographic situation in the rural part of the municipality, the number of inhabitants per household, the age structure of the population, etc., conclusions have been drawn about the perspectives and survival of certain Rural settlements, especially those of the so-called scattered type (settlements with several neighborhoods significantly away from the central part of the rural area). This type of settlements is mainly located in hilly and mountainous areas, where arable land has a low credit value and where the survival of the population is mainly based on the use of pastures and forests. Unlike this type of settlements, the compact type villages are spread in the plain parts or along the edges of the mountain branches.

The results from the monitoring of the situation indicate that in the Municipality of Delchevo 9 Rural settlements with a total population of 1.102 inhabitants (15.4% of the rural population) have households that are composed of an average of 2.65 members. Thus, the small number of members per household shows that in these settlements the elderly category with little or no increase prevails. Due to this situation, the prospects of these villages are insignificant and they are doomed to slow biological extinction.

In 6 Rural settlements in the municipality with a total population of 2.698 inhabitants (37.6% of the rural population) households have an average of 3.17 members. The elderly population in these villages is the largest, but it does not prevail, which gives hope that these inhabited villages can be maintained if their economic development is supported in a timely manner.

In the Municipality of Delchevo there are 5 Rural settlements with a total population of 3.256 inhabitants (45.4% of the rural population) which have an average of 3.75 members per household. These settlements are dominated by able-bodied population and the population from the age groups up to 17 years, while the elderly population is within normal limits. In these settlements, in addition to the development of livestock and fruit growing, some processing facilities should be developed. This will reduce the tendency of the population to migrate to the municipal center or to other areas in the country and abroad.

According to the 2021 census, there are 13.585 inhabitants.

Population and settlements in the municipality of Delchevo 
Until 1996, the Municipality of Delchevo was one of the 34 municipalities of the Republic of Macedonia. In 1990 the municipality had 26.315 inhabitants or 1.2% of the population of the Republic of Macedonia. The population in that period was divided into 30 settlements, including the city settlement Delchevo. 34% of the population of the municipality were concentrated in the town, and the rest was distributed in rural settlements and in a settlement of mixed type (Makedonska Kamenica). With the new territorial division of the Republic of Macedonia, which formed 123 municipalities, the Municipality of Makedonska Kamenica was separated from the Municipality of Delchevo, so that today it covers a territory of 423 km2 (163 mi2) with ⅔ of the population of the old Municipality. In addition to the municipal center Delchevo, there are 22 Rural settlements in the municipality.

According to the new territorial division, and in accordance with the data from the last census in 1994, the total population in the Municipality of Delchevo was 17.726 inhabitants, of which 10.554 are inhabitants of the town, and 7,172 inhabitants in rural areas. From the rural settlements in the Municipality of Delchevo, 5 villages had less than 100 inhabitants (Vratislavci, Kiselica, Kosovo Dabje, Selnik and Chiflik), 7 villages have 100 to 300 inhabitants (Vetren, Iliovo, Nov Istevnik, Ochipala, Star Istevnik, Turija and Poleto), in 3 villages were registered between 300 and 500 inhabitants (Bigla, Dramche and Stamer), while 6 villages had over 500 inhabitants (Grad, Virce, Trabotivishte, Gabrovo, Zvegor and Razlovci). The largest rural settlement is Zvegor with 949 inhabitants, followed by Razlovci with 907 inhabitants, Gabrovo with 829 inhabitants, Grad with 696 inhabitants, etc. The birth rate in the Municipality of Delchevo in 1998 was 10,7 live births per 1.000 inhabitants and is slightly lower than the average in the Republic of Macedonia which was 14,6 live births per 1.000 inhabitants. The mortality rate in the municipality in 1998 was 9,9 deaths per 1.000 inhabitants and is slightly higher than the average in the Republic of Macedonia which was 8,4. According to the 1994 census, there were 2.977 households in the city or 57.3%, and in rural areas 2.216 households or 42.7% of the total number of households in the municipality. There were 3.143 agricultural holdings in the municipality, of which 1.430 holdings (45.5%) belonged to the urban ones, and 1.713 holdings (54.5%) to the rural population. Hence it can be concluded that a significant part of the urban population is regularly or additionally engaged in agriculture.

Gender structure 
According to the gender structure, in the city and in the municipality as a whole, the male population slightly prevails with a share in the municipality with 50.8%, and in the city with 50.2%. Regarding the mechanical movement of the population, according to the statistical data taken from the National Statistical Office, the migration balance for 1994 and 1998 is negative and amounts to 28 and 29 emigrants, respectively.

Education 
The educational process in the municipality of Delchevo is given great importance, but unfortunately in the past it had an assimilative role. Finally, for the first time in the summer of 1944, the Macedonian word was heard in schools. Today, the educational activity is performed in two Primary schools and one state secondary school. The primary school "Vancho Prke" has 4 regional schools, two of which are eight-year schools in the villages of Bigla and Dramche and two four-year schools in the villages of Gabrovo and Zvegor. The elementary school "St. Kliment Ohridski" has 5 regional schools, of which 3 eight-year schools in the villages Razlovci, Trabotivishte and Grad and two four-year schools in Virce and Stamer. In both schools, classes are attended by about 1.970 students from first to eighth grade and about 100 children in preschool education, while the educational process is performed by 134 teachers and educators. In 1961 in Delchevo was opened a secondary school – Seconday school "Metodi Mitevski Brico". Today, it's attended by about 1.120 students, and 64 teachers are involved in the teaching process. The school has a branch in the neighboring municipality – Makedonska Kamenica.

Economy 
The accelerated development of the city begins in the second half of the XX century, so today Delchevo is a modern city with modern, wide and well-arranged streets, residential buildings and places for recreation and rest. Among the first established enterprises are "Monopol" today "Delchevo-Tabak", and "Sandanski" in the field of agriculture; "Pirin" and "Ilinden" in the field of trade; and "Partizanka" and "Kozarnica" in the field of industry.

There is no traditional industry in the municipality, Delchevo is a city in which industry and agriculture are equally represented. The production capacities of the textile industry have a small advantage, which are gaining momentum, and the construction of the Industrial Zone for Small Business will create conditions for even faster development.

There are two industrial zones in the city: north and south. Almost all facilities are located in both zones.

Government and politics 
In order to perform certain administrative, professional and other activities within the competencies for which the Municipality independently decides, as well as for the entrusted competencies, administrative bodies of the Municipality are formed. Administrative bodies are formed as Inspections, departments, sections and reports. Administrative bodies are formed as services, offices and clerks. The administrative and administrative bodies are established by the Municipal council with a special decision which more closely regulates the organization, the manner and the scope of work.

The Municipal council is a representative body of the citizens. The Municipal Council consists of 15 representatives of citizens elected in general, direct and free elections by secret ballot. The members of the council are elected for a period of 4 years in accordance with the Law. The member of the Council cannot be recalled. The Municipal Council elects a chairman from among the members of the council for a term of 4 years.

The Chairman of the Council convenes and chairs the sessions of the Municipal Council; takes care of the organization and work of the council, signs the decisions and acts of the council and submits them to the Mayor for proclamation and publication. The members and the chairman of the Council take and sign a solemn statement.

The Municipal Council has a secretary. The Secretary is elected by the Municipal Council for the duration of his/her/their term. A person graduated as a lawyer with at least 6 years of experience in the profession is elected Secretary of the council, in a manner and procedure determined by the Rules of Procedure of the council. The Secretary of the Council may not be a member of the council. The Secretary of the Council performs the professional, administrative and organizational work of the council and its working bodies. The Secretary of the Council coordinates the activities of the administrative and administrative bodies of the Municipality when they perform tasks within the competence of the Municipal Council.

The mayor of the municipality of Delchevo is Goran Trajkovski from the ranks of SDSM. He was elected in the 2021 local elections for a four-year term. The council of the municipality of Delchevo is composed of 15 members. According to the last local elections of 2021, with 8 members from SDSM, 6 from VMRO-DPMNE, and 1 from Levica, the members of the council for the mandate 2021–2025 are:

 Goce Popov (President)
 Dejan Georgievski
 Zekir Abdulov
 Sunchica Gjorgjieva
 Mario Skakarski
 Bojana Gocevska
 Kiril Trenchovski
 Jasmina Kjurchiska
 Toni Stamenkovski
 Sashko Ivanovski
 Ivan Gocevski
 Eli Rizova Angelovska
 Stefanija A. Jovakovski
 Olivera Tashevska
 Marjancho Velinovski

Culture 
The most important cultural-scientific event is "Gocevi Denovi" (Goce's days) which is traditionally held every year, at the beginning of June. The event first started in Delchevo in 1966 and soon gained an international character from local to state.

The celebrations on the occasion of the anniversaries of the Razlovci Uprising, the first of most uprisings in Macedonian history, are also important for Delchevo.

At the traditional "Golachki folklorni sredbi" (Golak folklore meetings) which are held every year on 8 and 9 August, cultural and artistic societies from Delchevo and neighboring municipalities present some of our rich folklore. Representatives of the twinned town of Jagodina – Serbia and cooperation with the border town of Simitli – Bulgaria are always present here.

Cultural heritage 
Churches and monasteries built in the middle of the XIX and the beginning of the XX century are landmarks for Delchevo and the surrounding areas. The most important and oldest is the church of St. Petka in Selnik, built in the 13th century and painted in the 16th century.

The church "St. Tsar Constantine and Helena "in Razlovci, built in the middle of the 19th century is of particular importance because among the portraits of the saints is the portrait of priest Stojan, the leader of the Razlovci uprising. It is even more significant that here is an application of the Ancient Macedonian heraldic symbol – the sixteen-pointed star from Kutles.

Next to the city, to the left of the road Delchevo – Golak, on the foundations of the old monastery is built a new one, dedicated to St. Bogorodica (St. Mother of Jesus). The construction of a new Cathedral church in the center of the city is underway, which will be named after the all-Slavic educators, the holy brothers Cyril and Methodius.

No less important historical sites are the medieval tower near Petrashevec and the ancient site "Gradiste" near the village Grad. There are a number of sites on the territory of the municipality that have not been explored yet.

Folk wear and embroidery 
The abundance of wool, hemp and cotton in the past provided favorable opportunities for the development of textile creativity in which the skill, ingenuity and spirit of living of a woman as a folk artist are woven.

They processed the textile raw materials with self-made tools, made with a lot of feelings.

The basic element of the women's costume is the long-sleeved cotton shirt on which they wore woolen clothes "saya" and "anteria" long below the knees, with and without sleeves, opened in advance along the entire length, decorated with braids and belts. The women's everyday costume also includes the woolen skirt "futa", a belt, woolen knitted socks and a head covering.

Famous people 
Several famous people came out of Delchevo. From those who have contributed to the Macedonian and world life, we single out:

 Ljupco Georgievski – former Prime Minister of Macedonia;
 Prof. Dr. Trajan Gocevski – Dean of the Faculty of Philosophy, Skopje;
 Prof. Dr. Aleksandar Atanasovski – Professor at the Faculty of Philosophy – Institute of History, Skopje;
 Prof. Dr. Misho Hristov – Professor at the Faculty of Mining and Geology, Skopje;
 Docent. Dr. Vanco Chabukovski – Docent at the Faculty of Natural Sciences and Mathematics – Institute of Informatics, Skopje;
 Vancho Trajanov – football player of FC "Maccabi Petah Tikva", Israel;
 Igor Mitrevski – football player in Russia;
 Meto Jovanovski – actor;
 Nikolcho Strukov – basketball player of "Vodnjanski Panthers".

References

External links
 

 
Delchevo
Eastern Statistical Region